John Alexander Henderson (December 21, 1841 – August 10, 1904) was a corporate lawyer and politician in Florida. He was an early resident of Tampa, the brother of William Benton Henderson. He studied law under James Gettis, who raised him after the death of his father. During the Civil War, Henderson was in Gettis's company. He was elected mayor of Tampa in 1870.

In 1876, he moved to Tallahassee. His second wife was the daughter of G. T. Ward. He served as general consul for the Florida Central & Peninsular Railroad Company. He was a trustee of the West Florida Seminary, and his daughter Jennie married Albert A. Murphree. He taught law to William Himes. He was a state senator. William D. Bloxham appointed him a US Senator when Wilkinson Call's term expired.

References

1841 births
1904 deaths
People from Tallahassee, Florida
Confederate States Army personnel
19th-century American lawyers
Mayors of Tampa, Florida
People of Florida in the American Civil War
Florida State University people